Australia's Own Judith Durham is a compilation album released in Australia in 1971 by Australian recording artist Judith Durham.

Track listing
 A1 "Gift of Song" (Patti Ingals)
 A2 "Wailing Of The Willow" (Harry Nilsson)
 A3 "Wanderlove" (Mason Williams)
 A4 "The Light Is Dark Enough" (Maitland-Kerr)
 A5 "Take Care of My Brother" (Art Podell)
 A6 "God Bless The Child" (A.Herzog Jr - B. Holiday)
 A7 "Here Am I" (Mason Williams)
 B1 "What Could Be a Better Way"
 B2 "Skyline Pigeon"
 B3 "The Ones Who Really Care"
 B4 "It Doesn't Cost Very Much"
 B5 "Ferris Wheel" 
 B6 "Climb Ev'ry Mountain" (R. Rodgers/O. Hammerstein II)

External links
 "Australia's Own Judith Durham" at discogs.com

References

1971 compilation albums
Judith Durham compilation albums
A&M Records compilation albums